The Gaumee Film Award for Best Lyricist is given as part of the Gaumee Film Awards for Maldivian Films.

The award was first given in 1995. Here is a list of the award winners and the nominees of the respective award ceremonies.

Winners and nominees

See also
 Gaumee Film Awards

References

Gaumee Film Awards